Nathan Paul Myhrvold (born August 3, 1959), formerly Chief Technology Officer at Microsoft, is co-founder of Intellectual Ventures and the principal author of Modernist Cuisine and its successor books. Myhrvold was listed as co-inventor on 17 U.S. patents at Microsoft and is co-inventor on over 900 other U.S. patents issued to his corporation and its affiliates.

Early life and education 
Myhrvold was born on August 3, 1959 in Seattle, Washington to Norwegian American parents. He was raised in Santa Monica, California, where he attended Mirman School and Santa Monica High School, graduating in 1974, and began college at age 14. Transferring from Santa Monica College, he studied mathematics (B.Sc.), and geophysics and space physics (Master's) at UCLA. He was awarded a Hertz Foundation Fellowship for graduate study and studied at Princeton University, where he earned a master's degree in mathematical economics and completed a Ph.D. in applied mathematics after completing a doctoral dissertation titled "Vistas in curved space-time quantum field theory" under the supervision of Malcolm Perry. For one year, he held a postdoctoral fellowship at the University of Cambridge working under Stephen Hawking.

Career

Early career 
Myhrvold left Cambridge to co-found a computer startup in Oakland, California. The company, Dynamical Systems Research Inc. (DSR), sought to produce Mondrian, a clone of IBM's TopView multitasking environment for DOS. Myhrvold served as DSR's president. Microsoft purchased DSR in 1986 for $1.5M in stock. Myhrvold worked at Microsoft for 13 years in a variety of executive positions, culminating in his appointment as the company's first chief technology officer in 1996. At Microsoft he founded Microsoft Research in 1991.

Intellectual Ventures 

After Microsoft, in 2000 Myhrvold co-founded Intellectual Ventures, a patent portfolio developer and broker in the areas of technology and energy, which has acquired over 30,000 patents. Intellectual Ventures takes part in the market for inventions and patents, buying patents from companies and inventors under the assumption the patents will be more valuable in the future. IV also files patents through the work of a team of on-site inventors. Startup companies spun out of IV, including Kymeta, Echodyne, and TerraPower, have developed commercial products from IV's inventions. Through its Global Good unit, which Myhrvold founded in collaboration with Bill Gates, IV has also invented and produced commercial products, such as improved vaccine coolers and milking cans, aimed at low-income markets in Africa and Asia. However, in most cases, IV's inventions are limited to the descriptions provided in their patents, which are bundled into portfolios for licensing.

Myhrvold has described his goal for Intellectual Ventures as helping to create a market for patent-backed securities. The company's business practices have caused controversy, however, with some deprecating the firm as a patent troll.  Myhrvold has publicly defended his firm's practices, arguing that they foster innovation by serving as a marketplace for intellectual property. He has noted that many of the largest companies in Silicon Valley, including Google, Apple, and Facebook, have also bought large patent portfolios and used litigation to protect them, but he has criticized them as focusing too much on creating "tools or toys for rich people."

In the popular press, Myhrvold's company Intellectual Ventures has been repeatedly accused of acting as patent trolls and stifling innovation by buying patents and then forcing inventors to license their ideas by means of litigation. Walt Mossberg interviewed Myhrvold about Intellectual Ventures' role as a "patent troll" during the 10th annual All Things Digital conference. This American Life's Laura Sydell ran an investigative story about patent trolling and Intellectual Ventures' role in that business.

According to The New York Times, Intellectual Ventures at one point controlled nearly 70,000 intellectual property assets (patents and patents pending) that it has used to generate approximately $3 billion in revenues, primarily in the form of license fees from large corporations. The company responds that it has returned more than $500 million to individual inventors and most of the remaining revenues to its investors.

Nuclear power 
Myhrvold is vice chairman of TerraPower, a spin-out of Intellectual Ventures that is developing a new kind of nuclear reactor, known as a traveling-wave reactor, that is designed to be safer, cheaper, and cleaner than current nuclear power plants. In 2020, the company launched a joint venture with GE Hitachi Nuclear Energy to build and operate a prototype reactor of this kind that combines a molten-sodium reactor with a molten salt energy storage system.

Science 
In addition to his business activities, Myhrvold is a working scientist who has published original, peer-reviewed research in the fields of paleobiology, climate science, and astronomy. A prize-winning nature and wildlife photographer, he has also been involved with paleontological research on expeditions with the Museum of the Rockies. His work has appeared in scientific journals including Science, Nature, Paleobiology, PLOS One, and the Physical Review, as well as in Fortune, Time, Scientific American, National Geographic Traveler, and Slate. He and Peter Rinearson helped Bill Gates write The Road Ahead, a book about the future that reached No. 1 on the New York Times bestseller list in 1995 and 1996. Myhrvold has contributed $1 million to the nonprofit SETI Institute in Mountain View, CA, for the development of the Allen Telescope Array, which was envisioned to be the most powerful instrument for SETI.

After the Science Museum in London successfully built the computing section of Charles Babbage's Difference Engine #2 in 1991, Myhrvold funded the construction of the output section, which performs both printing and stereotyping of calculated results. He also commissioned the construction of a second complete Difference Engine #2 for himself, which was on display at the Computer History Museum in Mountain View, California, from May 10, 2008 to January 31, 2016 and currently resides in the Intellectual Ventures Laboratory.

In research presented at scientific conferences and published in the astronomy journal Icarus, Myhrvold has been a vocal critic of procedures and results about asteroid diameters published by the NEOWISE team. A preprint of his work on the subject received wide press coverage prompting NASA to release a public statement defending their published research and pointing out the lack of peer review and methodological errors in Myhrvold's preprint.

Cooking 

While working as chief technology officer at Microsoft, Myhrvold took leave to earn his culinary diploma from École de Cuisine La Varenne in France. Myhrvold's early culinary training was as an observer and unpaid apprentice at Rover's, one of Seattle's leading restaurants, with Chef Thierry Rautureau. Myhrvold is the principal author of a culinary text entitled Modernist Cuisine: The Art and Science of Cooking, released in March 2011, on the application of scientific research principles and new techniques and technology to cooking. That book, which earned a James Beard Foundation Award for "cookbook of the year" in 2012, was followed by the books Modernist Cuisine at Home, The Photography of Modernist Cuisine, Modernist Bread, and Modernist Pizza, all self-published by Myhrvold and with him as lead author. Myhrvold was part of a team that won first place at the world barbecue championships in Memphis. He has appeared as a guest judge on Top Chef.

Advocacy 
In interviews with CNN, SuperFreakonomics author Stephen Dubner, and Scientific American, Myhrvold has discussed ways to reverse some of the effects of global warming/climate change by using geoengineering. Another approach would stimulate the formation and brightening of marine clouds to reflect more sunlight back into space.

Affiliations and awards 
Myhrvold received the James Beard Foundation Award for cookbook of the year in 2012 and an honorary degree from The Culinary Institute of America in 2013 for his book Modernist Cuisine: The Art and Science of Cooking. His book Modernist Bread received a James Beard Foundation book award in 2018. In 2010, Myhrvold was named by Foreign Policy magazine to its list of top 100 global thinkers. He was selected as the keynote speaker for the UCLA College commencement ceremonies on Friday, June 12, 2015 and received the Earth, Planetary and Space Sciences Luminary Award from the UCLA Division of Physical Sciences in 2021. In 2013, Myhrvold was a judge for the inaugural Queen Elizabeth Prize for Engineering. Princeton University awarded him the James Madison Medal in 2005. He received the Golden Plate Award of the American Academy of Achievement in 1996.

Myhrvold endorsed Democratic candidate Hillary Clinton in the 2016 U.S. presidential election.

Personal life 
Myhrvold is married to Rosemarie Havranek, whom he met while studying at Princeton. They have twin sons, Conor and Cameron A. Myhrvold. Cameron studied biology at Princeton, and then did his PhD at Harvard's Systems, Synthetic, and Quantitative Biology Program. After that he got a postdoc position at Pardis Sabeti lab in Harvard, working closely with Feng Zhang on CRISPR. After his postdoc, he started his own lab at Princeton.

Nathan Myhrvold also has a younger brother, Cameron.

References

Further reading 
Auletta, Ken, "The Highwaymen", Harvest Books, 1998.   — cf Chapter 17: The Microsoft Provocateur: Nathan Myhrvold, Bill Gates Corporate Gadfly.
Edstrom, Jennifer and Eller, Marlin, "Barbarians Led by Bill Gates: Microsoft From The Inside: How The World's Richest Corporation Wields Its Power", Holt Paperbacks, 1999.

External links 
Biography from Intellectual Ventures
Who's afraid of Nathan Myhrvold?, Fortune, July 10, 2006
In the Air: Who says big ideas are rare?, Malcolm Gladwell, The New Yorker, May 12, 2008
The intellectual venturer, by Michael Watts 21.January 2011 Wired UK
Microsoft’s Former CTO Takes On Modernist Cuisine, by Mark McClusky February 24, 2011 Wired.com
TED talk (embedded video): Nathan Myhrvold: A life of fascinations
 TED talk (embedded video): Nathan Myhrvold:  Could this Laser Zap Malaria? TED lecture with demonstration Feb 2010

"Nathan Myhrvold, Myth Buster". 1843 (The Economist). January/February 2015. Retrieved January 1, 2018.

Academics of the University of Cambridge
University of California, Los Angeles alumni
UCLA Department of Earth Planetary and Space Sciences alumni
Princeton University alumni
Microsoft employees
American people of Norwegian descent
American chief executives
American chief technology officers
Sustainability advocates
Living people
1959 births
American company founders
Chefs from Seattle